Nahanni Butte Airport  is a public aerodrome located near Nahanni Butte, Northwest Territories, Canada, east of the Nahanni National Park Reserve.

Pilots are requested to check for the presence of wood bison on the runway prior to landing.

See also
Nahanni Butte Water Aerodrome

References

Registered aerodromes in the Dehcho Region